Prince Henveyru Ganduvaru Manippulu, (al-Hassan 'Izz ud-din Henveyru Ganduvaru Manippulu) (1902–1938), the son of the Sultan Muhammad Shamsuddeen III. He was named the Crown Prince of the Maldives on February 8, 1931 by his father.

He studied at Royal College Colombo in Ceylon. After spending several years in Ceylon (Sri Lanka), he came back in 1920 and took up residence at Muliaage.

Muliaa’ge was occupied by Prince Hassan Izzuddin between 1920 and 1934. The house did not prove auspicious for the prince, though he apparently spent a lot of time there. It was famous throughout Male’, as a place for merriment and gaiety with numerous music and dance performances organised by the young prince for his entertainment. Izzuddin however soon became the victim of a smear campaign organized by his uncle Al Ameer Abdul Majeed Rannabandeyri Kilegefaanu and cousin Hassan Fareed. Ultimately he was discredited and banished in 1934 to the isolated southerly island of Fuvahmulah where he died in 1938.

References

1902 births
1938 deaths
Maldivian nobility
Alumni of Royal College, Colombo
People from Malé